The 1931–32 season was the 58th season of competitive football by Rangers.

Overview

Results
All results are written with Rangers' score first.

Scottish League Division One

Scottish Cup

Appearances

See also
 1931–32 in Scottish football
 1931–32 Scottish Cup

Rangers F.C. seasons
Rangers